Salse is a village in the Karmala taluka of Solapur district in Maharashtra state, India.

Demographics
Covering  and comprising 581 households at the time of the 2011 census of India, Salse had a population of 2628. There were 1388 males and 1240 females, with 294 people being aged six or younger.

References

Villages in Karmala taluka